The discography of American singer-songwriter Giveon consists of one studio album, one compilation album, two extended plays, and nine singles (including one as a featured artist). On March 27, 2020, Giveon released his debut extended play, Take Time. The EP reached number 35 on the Billboard 200. It produced the top-20 single, "Heartbreak Anniversary", which reached number 16 on the Billboard Hot 100. That same year, he released a collaboration with Drake, "Chicago Freestyle", which debuted and peaked at number 14 on the Hot 100. On October 2, 2020, Giveon released his second extended play, When It's All Said and Done. The EP debuted and peaked at number 93 on the Billboard 200. On March 12, 2021, Giveon released his debut compilation album, When It's All Said and Done...Take Time. The album debuted and peaked at number five on the Billboard 200. That same year, he was featured alongside Daniel Caesar on Justin Bieber's single, "Peaches", which debuted and peaked atop the Hot 100, giving him his first chart-topping single. Later that year, he was featured alongside Lil Durk on Drake's song, "In the Bible", which debuted and peaked at number seven on the Hot 100. On June 24, 2022, Giveon released his debut studio album, Give or Take.

Studio albums

Compilation albums

Extended plays

Singles

As lead artist

As featured artist

Other charted songs

Guest appearances

Notes

References

Discographies of American artists
Contemporary R&B discographies